Charles J. Kirk (born 1993) is an American conservative activist and radio talk show host. He founded Turning Point USA with Bill Montgomery in 2012, and has served as its executive director since. He is the CEO of Turning Point Action, Students for Trump, and Turning Point Academy, Turning Point Faith, president of Turning Point Endowment, and a member of the Council for National Policy. Kirk has authored four books.

Early life and education 
Kirk was born in the Chicago suburb of Arlington Heights, Illinois, and raised in nearby Prospect Heights, Illinois. His mother is a mental health counselor and his father is an architect. Kirk was a member of the Boy Scouts of America and earned the rank of Eagle Scout. In his junior year at Wheeling High School in 2010, he volunteered for the successful U.S. Senate campaign of Illinois Republican Mark Kirk, to whom he is not related. In senior year he created a campaign to revert a price increase for cookies at his school. He also wrote an essay alleging liberal bias in high school textbooks for Breitbart News which led to an appearance on Fox Business.

At a subsequent speaking engagement at Benedictine University's "Youth Empowerment Day," Kirk met Bill Montgomery, a retiree more than 50 years his senior, who was then a Tea Party-backed legislative candidate.  Montgomery encouraged Kirk to get engaged in political activism full-time. He subsequently founded Turning Point USA, a "grass-roots organization to rival liberal groups such as MoveOn.org." At the 2012 Republican National Convention, Kirk met Foster Friess, a prominent Republican donor, and persuaded him to finance the organization.

Kirk briefly attended Harper College, a junior community college near Chicago, but dropped out without having completed any degree or certificate.

Leadership of Turning Point organizations

Turning Point USA 
Kirk has been CEO, chief fundraiser, and the public face of Turning Point since its founding. He co-founded the organization in 2012 at 18 years of age.  According to The New York Times, he has turned the organization into a "well-funded media operation, backed by conservative megadonors like the Wyoming businessman Foster Friess." TPUSA's activities include publication of the Professor Watchlist and the School Board Watchlist.

In 2020, ProPublica investigated the finances of Turning Point USA and claimed in their report that the organization made "misleading financial claims," that the audits were not done by an independent auditor, and that the leaders had enriched themselves while advocating for Trump. ProPublica also reported that Kirk's salary from TPUSA had increased from $27,000 to nearly $300,000 and that he had bought an $855,000 condo in Longboat Key, Florida. In 2020, Turning Point USA had $39.2 million in revenues. Kirk earned a salary of more than $325,000 from TPUSA and related organizations.

In 2021, Turning Point USA announced an online academy targeted towards students in schools "poisoning our youth with anti-American ideas." Turning Point Academy was intended to cater to families seeking an "America-first education". Arizona education firm StrongMind initially partnered with Turning Point USA with plans to open the academy by the fall of 2022 and assessed its "potential to generate over $40 million in gross revenue at full capacity (10,000 students)." The partnership ended after StrongMind received backlash from its own employees and key subcontractor Freedom Learning Group, who prepared course content for the academy, also backed out of the academy after learning that it would be run by Turning Point USA.

Turning Point Action 
In May 2019, it was reported that Kirk was "preparing to unveil" Turning Point Action, a 501(c)(4) entity allowed to target Democrats.

In July 2019, Kirk announced that Turning Point Action had acquired Students for Trump along with "all associated media assets". He became chairman and launched a campaign to recruit one million students for the 2020 Trump reelection campaign. The unsuccessful effort led to TPUSA and the Trump campaign blaming each other for an overall decline in youth support for Trump.

Turning Point Endowment 
Turning Point Endowment Inc., formed in 2017, is a self-described "supporting organization" whose "mission is to support and benefit Turning Point USA's charitable purposes and long-term vitality."

Turning Point Faith
After Liberty University did not renew Kirk's contract with the Falkirk Center for Faith and Liberty in 2021, Charlie Kirk founded Turning Point Faith, an organization dedicated to "recruit pastors and other church leaders to be active in local and national political issues." Its activities include faith-based voter drives "and educating members on TPUSA's core values." According to TPUSA's 2021 Investor Prospectus, the program—with a budget of $6.4 million—"will 'address America’s crumbling religious foundation by engaging thousands of pastors nationwide' in order to 'breathe renewed civic engagement into our churches'."

Turning Point Academy
Turning Point Academy is a movement "dedicated to reclaiming the education of our children, reviving virtuous education focused on truth, goodness, and beauty, and restoring God as the foundation of education."

Council for National Policy and CNP Action

Kirk is the William F. Buckley Jr. Council Member of the Council for National Policy (CNP), a secretive group "that has served for decades as a hub for a nationwide network of conservative activists and the donors who support them," according to the CNP's September 2020 membership directory leaked in February 2021. He is a spokesperson for CNP Action, the political arm of the CNP.

Mount Vernon Project
According to Kirk, the Mount Vernon Project is a movement to "recruit leaders to serve on the (Republican National Committee) RNC and at the state level who wish to better represent the grassroots voice."

Talk radio host
In October 2020, Kirk began hosting a daily three-hour radio talk show, called The Charlie Kirk Show, on Salem Media's "The Answer" radio channel.

Political positions and activities

Promotion of falsehoods and conspiracy theories

Kirk promotes the Cultural Marxism conspiracy theory, and has described universities as "islands of totalitarianism." 
In a 2015 speech at the Liberty Forum of Silicon Valley, Kirk stated that he had applied to the United States Military Academy in West Point, New York, and was not accepted. He said that "the slot he considered his went to 'a far less-qualified candidate of a different gender and a different persuasion'" whose test scores he claimed he knew. He told The New Yorker in 2017 that he was being sarcastic when he said it. He told the Chicago Tribune in 2018 that "he was just repeating something he'd been told," while at a New Hampshire Turning Point event featuring Rand Paul in October 2019 he claimed that he never said it.

On July 7, 2018, Kirk falsely claimed on social media that Justice Department statistics showed an increase in human trafficking arrests from 1,952 in the year 2016 to 6,087 in the first half of 2018. He deleted the tweet without an explanation the next day, after a fact-checker had pointed out that the false 2018 number had originated on conspiracy site 8chan.

In December 2018, Kirk falsely claimed that protesters in the French yellow vests movement chanted "We want Trump." These false claims were later repeated by President Trump himself.

In defending the Trump administration's response to the COVID-19 pandemic, Kirk falsely stated that during the H1N1 swine flu pandemic it "took President Barack Obama 'millions infected and over 1,000 deaths'" to declare a public health emergency.

Kirk has spread falsehoods about voter fraud and the COVID-19 pandemic. According to Forbes, Kirk is known for "his repudiation of liberal college education and embrace of pro-Trump conspiracy theories."

Racial issues

Charlie Kirk has consistently asserted that the concept of white privilege is a myth and a "racist lie". Kirk served on President Donald Trump's 1776 Commission, a response to the 1619 Project." During a September 2021 episode of The Charlie Kirk Show, he called for Texas to create a "citizen force" and have them deport Haitians. Assuming "more hard-right positions", he said that Democratic immigration policies were aimed at "diminishing and decreasing white demographics in America". In October 2021, Kirk began the "Exposing Critical Racism Tour" of a number of campuses and off-campus venues to "fight racist theories on America's college campuses!!" On the Minnesota leg of the tour on October 5, 2021, Kirk called George Floyd a "scumbag" and appeared to refer to the January 6 riot at the U.S. Capitol when he said that "if you dare walk into the U.S. Capitol building and take a selfie, they'll put you in solitary confinement."

In November 2021, Kirk told Fox News readers that state power should be used to stop teachers from indoctrinating children with critical race theory: "Directly confronting the left, and promising to fight their illiberal ideology with state power when necessary, is the key to winning everyday Americans."

Climate change
Kirk has consistently supported the extraction and use of fossil fuels and has falsely claimed that humans have no significant effect on global climate change.

Death penalty
Kirk has stated that he is against the death penalty.

Republican and pro-Trump activism

Kirk addressed the 2016 Republican National Convention. In an interview with Wired magazine during the convention, Kirk said that while he "was not the world's biggest Donald Trump fan," he would vote for him, and that Trump's candidacy made Turning Point's mission more difficult. Kirk flipped to supporting Trump at the 2016 Republican National Convention and spent the remainder of the campaign assisting with travel and media arrangements for Donald Trump Jr.

In October 2016, Kirk participated in a Fox News event along with Trump Jr., Eric Trump, and Lara Trump that had a pro-Donald Trump tone.

In July 2019, Kirk became chairman of Students for Trump, which had been acquired by Turning Point Action, and launched a campaign to recruit one million students for the 2020 Trump reelection campaign. The unsuccessful effort led to TPUSA and the Trump campaign blaming each other for an overall decline in youth support for Trump.

At an August 2020 meeting of the Council for National Policy, Kirk said: "Democrats have done a really foolish thing by shutting down all these campuses... It's gonna remove ballot harvesting opportunities and all their voter fraud that they usually do on college campuses - so they're actually removing half a million votes off the table. So please keep the campuses closed - it's a great thing. Whatever!"

The New York Times argued that Kirk "[walks] the line between mainstream conservative opinion and outright disinformation." and that "with a powerful ally in the president's eldest son, Donald Trump Jr., Mr. Kirk both amplifies the president's message and helps shape it.

COVID-19 misinformation

Kirk spread false information and conspiracy theories about COVID-19 on social media platforms, such as Twitter, in 2020. Kirk sharply criticized Democrats' criticism of Donald Trump's withdrawal of World Health Organization (WHO) funding and referred to COVID-19 as the "China virus", which was retweeted by Trump. Kirk alleged that the WHO covered up information about the COVID-19 pandemic. He was briefly banned from Twitter after falsely claiming that hydroxychloroquine had proved to be "100% effective in treating the virus"; He alleged Gretchen Whitmer, the Democratic governor of Michigan, threatened doctors who tried to use the medication. These falsehoods were retweeted by Rudy Giuliani whose account was then suspended by Twitter as well. Kirk also described the public health measure of social distancing prohibitions in churches as a "Democratic plot against Christianity" and made the unfounded assertion that authorities in Wuhan, China, were burning patients. Kirk has said that he refuses to abide by mask requirements, claiming that "the science around masks is very questionable."

In July 2021, Kirk pushed misleading claims about the efficacy and safety of COVID-19 vaccines. On Fox News' Tucker Carlson show, Kirk called student mandatory requirements for taking the COVID-19 vaccine "medical apartheid".

Election fraud claims and the 2021 United States Capitol attack

Immediately after Donald Trump lost the 2020 presidential election, Kirk promoted unsubstantiated claims of fraud in the election. On November 5, 2020, Kirk was the leader of a Stop the Steal protest at the Maricopa Tabulation Center in Phoenix.

Charlie Kirk was considered a "Big name" social influencer in Rudy Giuliani's communications plan to Stop the Steal.

On January 5, 2021, the day before the Washington protest that led to the storming of the United States Capitol, Kirk wrote on Twitter that Turning Point Action and Students for Trump were sending more than 80 "buses of patriots to D.C. to fight for this president". A spokesman for Turning Point said that the groups ended up sending seven buses, not 80, with 350 students. In the lead-up to the storming, Kirk said he was "getting 500 emails a minute calling for a civil war." Publix heiress Julie Fancelli gave Charlie Kirk's organizations $1.25 million to fund the buses to the January 6th event. Kirk also paid $60,000 for Kimberly Guilfoyle to speak at the Trump rally.  

Afterward, Kirk said the violent acts at the Capitol were not an insurrection and did not represent mainstream Trump supporters.

Appearing before the United States House Select Committee on the January 6 Attack, Charlie Kirk pleaded the Fifth Amendment privilege against self-incrimination. His team however "provided the committee with 8,000 pages of records in response to its requests." In another closed-door meeting of the House January 6 Committee, Ali Alexander blamed Kirk and Turning Point USA for financing the travel of demonstrators to the Stop the Steal rally.

Views on relationships and "sexual anarchy"
In October 2021, Kirk said on his podcast that Democrats wanted Americans to live where "there is no cultural identity, where you live in sexual anarchy, where private property is a thing of the past, and the ruling class controls everything." Following social media backlash, he released a statement on the website of the Claremont Institute doubling down on and expanding his remarks.

In February 2022, in response to the Super Bowl LVI halftime show, Kirk said that "The NFL is now the league of sexual anarchy. This halftime show should not be allowed on television." This statement was criticized by both liberals and conservatives.

According to Media Matters, at the TPUSA Young Women's Leadership Summit 2022 Conference, Kirk said that the "biblical model" for women to pursue in romantic relationships is a partner who is "a protector and a leader, and deep down, a vast majority of you agree." and that "if you want to go meet conservative men that have their act together, that aren't like, woke beta men, like, start a Turning Point USA chapter, you'll meet a lot of them."

2022 Ukraine invasion 
After Russia invaded Ukraine in February 2022, Kirk characterized the conflict as a "border dispute" and spread false claims from Russian state media that Ukraine was firing mortar shells at a Russian separatist enclave in Ukraine.

At the February 2022 Conservative Political Action Conference, Kirk said that "The southern border matters a lot more than the Ukrainian border" and that "In fact, I want every Republican leader who comes up on stage the next couple days to call what's happening on the southern border an invasion because two million people waltzed into our country last year."

Conflict with the Republican National Committee
In December 2022, Kirk warned the Republican National Committee that they needed to listen to their grassroots voters or face the consequences of ignoring them. Kirk stated that “If ignored, we will have the most stunted and muted Republican Party in the history of the conservative movement, the likes of which we haven’t seen in generations.”

Falkirk Center for Faith and Liberty
In November 2019, Kirk and Jerry Falwell, Jr. co-founded the "Falkirk Center for Faith and Liberty," a right-wing think-tank funded, owned and housed by Liberty University. Fellows included Antonio Okafor, director of outreach for Gun Owners of America, Sebastian Gorka, former deputy assistant to President Trump, and Jenna Ellis, a senior legal counselor for Trump. In 2020, the Falkirk Center spent at least $50,000 on political Facebook advertisements promoting Trump and Republican candidates.

Students and alumni raised objections about the organization's aggressive political tone, which they considered to be inconsistent with the university's mission. Falwell resigned as president of Liberty University in August 2020, and the university did not renew Kirk's one-year contract in late 2020. In 2021, the university renamed the organization "Standing for Freedom Center".

Awards, achievements and honors
Kirk was listed on the 2018 Forbes 30 Under 30 in Law & Policy.

In May 2019, Kirk was awarded an honorary doctorate from Liberty University.

Books
Kirk co-wrote, with Brent Hamachek, the 2016 book Time for a Turning Point: Setting a Course Toward Free Markets and Limited Government for Future Generations (Simon & Schuster).

Kirk wrote the 2018 book Campus Battlefield: How Conservatives Can WIN the Battle on Campus and Why It Matters. Donald Trump Jr. wrote the foreword for the book.  In a review for The Weekly Standard, Adam Rubenstein described the book as a "hot mess", "nothing more than a marketing pitch for TPUSA" and said the "thin" book was "stuffed with reprintings of his tweets and quotes from others."

In 2020, Kirk's book The MAGA Doctrine: The Only Ideas That Will Win the Future was published.

In 2022, Kirk's 4th book, The College Scam: How America's Universities Are Bankrupting and Brainwashing Away the Future of America's Youth was published.

Media 
As of December 7, 2021, The Charlie Kirk Show podcast was ranked as the 21st most popular podcast on Apple podcasts. Kirk's "Turning Point Live" is a three-hour streaming talk show aimed at Generation Z. Turning Point USA's monthly online average has grown to 111,000 unique visitors in 2021. A February 2023 Brookings Institution study found Kirk's podcast contained the second-highest proportion of false, misleading and unsubstantiated statements among 36,603 episodes produced by 79 prominent political podcasters.

In 2022, journalist Bari Weiss released a report of internal Twitter documents dubbed "The Twitter Files", which alleged that Twitter was censoring conservative personalities on the social media platform.   Weiss posted screenshots of Twitter tools that moderators could use to limit the reach of posts and accounts.  According to Rolling Stone magazine, Charlie Kirk's Twitter account was flagged under "do not amplify", which meant algorithms would not highlight tweets coming from those accounts.

Personal life

Kirk is an evangelical Christian. In May 2021, Kirk married Erika Frantzve, a podcaster and businesswoman who won the Miss Arizona USA pageant competition in 2012. The couple welcomed their first child together, a daughter, in August 2022.

References

External links

  
 

1993 births
Living people
21st-century evangelicals
Activists from Florida
Activists from Illinois
American evangelicals
American podcasters
American political activists
Conservatism in the United States
Illinois Republicans
People from Arlington Heights, Illinois
People from Longboat Key, Florida
People from Prospect Heights, Illinois
People from Wheeling, Illinois
YouTube podcasters